The 1894–95 Irish Cup was the fifteenth edition of the premier knock-out cup competition in Irish football. 

Linfield won the tournament for the fourth time, defeating Bohemians 10–1 in the final. This remains both the largest margin of victory and the highest scoring Irish Cup final in history.

Results
St Columb's Court, Bright Stars, Royal West Kent Regiment (a British Army team based in Derry), Derry North End, Limavady, St Columb's Hall Celtic, Royal Inniskilling Fusiliers (a British Army team based in Enniskillen) and Strabane were all given byes into the second round. 
Cliftonville, Distillery, Donacloney, Glentoran, Linfield, 13th Hussars (a British Army team based in Dundalk) and Moyola Park were given byes into the third round.
Dublin University, Leinster Nomads, Bohemians and Montpelier were given byes into the fourth round.

First round

|}

After winning their match Belfast Celtic were given a bye into the third round.

Second round

|}

Replays

|}

Second replay

|}

Third round

|}

Teams that won in this round were given a bye into the fifth round.

Fourth round

|}

Fifth round

|}

Replay

|}

Semi-finals

|}

Final

References

External links
 Northern Ireland Cup Finals. Rec.Sport.Soccer Statistics Foundation (RSSSF)

Irish Cup seasons
1894–95 domestic association football cups
1894–95 in Irish association football